For lists of Italy national football team results see:

 Italy national football team results (1910–1929)
 Italy national football team results (1930–1949)
 Italy national football team results (1950–1969)
 Italy national football team results (1970–1989)
 Italy national football team results (1990–2009)
 Italy national football team results (2010–present)
 Italy national football team results (unofficial matches)